Langheld's skink (Trachylepis langheldi) is a species of skink found in Cameroon, Mali, and Ivory Coast.

References

Trachylepis
Reptiles described in 1917
Taxa named by Richard Sternfeld